The Montrose Park is a public park, owned by the federal government, located in the 3000 block of R Street, Northwest, Washington, D.C., in the Georgetown neighborhood.
It is located between Dumbarton Oaks Park and Oak Hill Cemetery.   
Both Montrose Park and Dumbarton Oaks Park were jointly listed on the National Register of Historic Places on May 28, 1967. Montrose Park obtained an individual listing in 2007.
In addition to a large children's play area in the back of the park, there are two sets of tennis courts, as well as open space with footwalks and trails which lead into Rock Creek Park.

History

It was early owned by ropemaker Robert Parrott, who allowed the community to use it as a picnicing ground. Sarah Louisa Rittenhouse successfully led a group to lobby Congress to acquire the property as an addition to Rock Creek Park.

See also
Rock Creek Park

References

External links

 Montrose Park (U.S. National Park Service)

Parks on the National Register of Historic Places in Washington, D.C.
Protected areas established in 1911
1911 establishments in Washington, D.C.
Georgetown (Washington, D.C.)
Rock Creek Park
Ropewalks